William Baker (christened 29 February 1832) was an English cricketer who played one match for Kent County Cricket Club in 1858. He was born at Cobham, Kent.

The son of James and Sarah Baker, he played cricket for Cobham and made a single first-class cricket appearance in 1858 against an England side at Lord's. He scored three runs in the first innings in which he batted and a duck in the second innings. Baker worked as a bricklayer's labourer and later became an engine fitter, moving to Stratford in Essex. His younger brother, George was employed for a time at the same works and also played for Kent. Baker was married and was still living at Stratford in retirement at the 1901 census but it is not known when he died.

References

External links

1832 births
English cricketers
Kent cricketers
People from Cobham, Kent
Year of death missing